The 1999 Jeep Oahu Bowl was a college football bowl game, played as part of the bowl game schedule of the 1999 NCAA Division I-A football season. The second edition of the Oahu Bowl, it was the latter part of a Christmas Day doubleheader at Aloha Stadium in Honolulu, Hawaii, preceded by the Aloha Bowl. Televised by ESPN, the game on December 25 matched the Hawaii Warriors, co-champions of the Western Athletic Conference (WAC), and the favored Oregon State Beavers of the Pacific-10 Conference (Pac-10), who were making their first bowl game appearance in 35 years.

Tied at ten at halftime, Hawaii scored thirteen straight points to win 23–17 and finished the season at 9–4; the Beavers fell  The victory capped one of the most memorable seasons in school history as Hawaii had seen an improvement of nine wins over the previous winless season in 1998.

Scoring summary
First quarter
OSU - Ken Simonton 1-yard run (Ryan Cesca kick) (8:08). 7–0 OSU

Second quarter
HAW - Eric Hannum 26-yard FG. (12:40). 7–3 OSU
HAW - Channon Harris 9-yard pass from Dan Robinson (Hannum kick). (6:05). 10–7 HAW
OSU - Cesca 37-yard FG. (00:00). 10–10 Tie

Third quarter
HAW - Harris 30-yard pass from Robinson (Hannum kick). (6:30). 17–10 HAW
HAW - Hannum 22-yard FG. (2:10). 20–10 HAW

Fourth quarter
HAW - Hannum 35-yard FG. (2:58). 23–10 HAW
OSU - Simonton 13-yard run (Cesca kick) (1:27). 23–17 HAW

References

Oahu Bowl
Oahu Bowl
Hawaii Rainbow Warriors football bowl games
Oregon State Beavers football bowl games
Oahu Bowl
Oahu Bowl